Samuel Abraham Marx (August 27, 1885 - January 1964) was an American architect, designer and interior decorator. He is generally considered a modernist, influenced by the International style.

Biography
Marx was born to a Jewish family in Natchez, Mississippi, in 1885. He graduated from MIT's Department of Architecture in 1907, with his thesis Design for a Synagogue. He then went studying to Europe for eight months.

Before opening his own practice, he worked for Killham & Hopkins in Boston, and for Shepley, Rutan & Coolidge in Chicago. While he originally designed interior of hotels and department stores, Marx became a mostly residential architect, designing stripped-down buildings reminiscent of Mies van der Rohe's works, while he became respected for his aesthetic and functional integrated furnitures and decorative elements.

Along with his third wife, Florene May (daughter of David May, the founder of The May Department Stores Company), he was an avid art collector. While many of his buildings were razed, his enormous collection was dispersed over the years.

Posterity
House Beautiful magazine (1948) said about his works “it’s frequently hard to say where the architecture ends and the furniture begins.”

Relatively overshadowed as an architect, Marx is, and has been a major influence in furniture design (notably industrial). Liz O'Brien's recent monography, Ultramodern, Samuel Marx: Architect, Designer, Art Collector asserts his role in the modernist movement.

Notable works
As an architect :
 Alexander Hamilton Memorial in Chicago's Lincoln Park
 New Orleans Museum of Art
 Edward G. Robinson’s home, Los Angeles
 May Company department store in Los Angeles
 Tom May's house, Los Angeles
 Morton D. May's house, St Louis (razed)

As an interior decorator :
 Pierre Hotel, New York

Works of his as a designer are exhibited in the Metropolitan Museum of Art, the Museum of Modern Art (MoMA) and the Chicago Art Institute, and some are regularly auctioned by private decorative arts dealers.

References

See also

 John Angel (sculptor)

1885 births
1964 deaths
20th-century American architects
American Jews
American furniture designers
Modernist architects
Jewish architects
May family